Oulhassa Gheraba District is a district of Aïn Témouchent Province, Algeria.

Municipalities 
The district is divided into 2 municipalities:
Oulhaça El Gheraba
Sidi Ouriache

References 

Districts of Aïn Témouchent Province